Swahid Maniram Dewan College, established in 1964, is a general degree college situated at Charing, in Sivasagar district, Assam. This college is one of the oldest colleges of Upper Assam and affiliated with the Dibrugarh University.

Departments

Arts
Assamese
English
History
Economics
Philosophy
Political Science
Geography

References

External links

Universities and colleges in Assam
Colleges affiliated to Dibrugarh University
Educational institutions established in 1964
1964 establishments in Assam